Fag Hag is the debut film of director Damion Dietz, who also wrote the film and has a lead role in it alongside Stephanie Orff. It was released in 1998.
The film has been praised for its lighting design although panned for its script.

Cast
Stephanie Orff, (aka Stephanie Harnisch) as Destiny Rutt
Damion Dietz as Scott Bushey
Saadia Billman as Sasha Cardona
Darryl Theirse as Pageant Director
Wil Wheaton as Christian Bookstore Manager
Jaush Way as Madonna-obsessed Party Host
Keythe Farley as Confused Gay Basher
Ann Closs as Lola Beavers
Sharon Orff as Wakie Funches
Jill Kocalis as Colada Bang

References

External links

1998 films
American LGBT-related films
Films directed by Damion Dietz
Troma Entertainment films
1998 directorial debut films
1990s English-language films
1990s American films